Elise Mertens was the defending champion heading into the tournament. She successfully defended the title after defeating unseeded Romanian, Mihaela Buzărnescu in the final, 6–1, 4–6, 6–3 to become the first two-time champion at the Hobart International. The final saw four rain separate rain delays which saw the match be completed in eight hours.

Seeds

Draw

Finals

Top half

Bottom half

Qualifying

Seeds

Qualifiers

Qualifying draw

First qualifier

Second qualifier

Third qualifier

Fourth qualifier

Fifth qualifier

Sixth qualifier

References

External links
 Main Draw
 Qualifying Draw

Singles
Hobart International